Sub Templum is an album by British doom metal band Moss. Released in 2008, it is their first for Rise Above Records (owned by former Napalm Death and Cathedral vocalist Lee Dorrian) and second overall. It was produced by Electric Wizard guitarist/vocalist Jus Oborn, and it features 4 songs, two of which are over 20 minutes in length (with the longest, "Gate III" being 35:31).

This album saw Moss move away from the partly improvised flow of first album Cthonic Rites and towards more structured pieces, which became even more evident on 2009's following EP Tombs of the Blind Drugged. 
For his review, allmusic's Greg Prato gave the record 2 stars, saying that "the Moss gentlemen seem to be more interested in seeing how much air they can push out of their maxed-to-ten amplifiers than in songcraft."

Track listing
All songs written by Moss.

Liner notes
In the liner notes for the album the band give a list of 'visual stimuli', which consists some of what the band watched during the recording process. The list is:

Death Line
A Warning to the Curious,
Last House on Dead End Street
Alucarda
Threads
Horror of Fang Rock
Death SS: 1977–2007,
Assault
Curse of the Claw
She Killed in Ecstasy
The Tomb of Ligeia

Personnel
Olly Pearson - vocals, Hammond Organ
Dominic Finbow - guitars
Chris Chantler - drums, percussion

Production
Jus Oborn - producer
Moss - producer
Chris Fielding - engineer
Shawn Joseph - mastering

References

2008 albums
Moss (band) albums
Rise Above Records albums
Candlelight Records albums